Cumplo is a crowdlending company, operating in Mexico, Chile and Perú. Cumplo connects small and medium-sized companies that need financing with investors and institutions that are willing to invest in their dreams and projects. Cumplo's mission is to eliminate inequality in access to capital for SMEs in Peru, Mexico and Chile. They offer financing alternatives that help them obtain liquidity quickly, simply and at a fair rate, so they can grow and develop.

It is a closed stock company, consisting of a directory of five members, whose president and founder is Nicolas Shea Carey. Since its beginning, it has funded more than USD 1600 million in loans for SMEs. It is certified as a B corporation.

History 
The Founder is Nicolas Shea, a Chilean entrepreneur who sought to create a more fair system to eliminate inequality in access to capital. So he decided to create the first collaborative financing platform in Latin America, which initially delivered loans to people.

It costed them more tan a year to start operating, they were cataloged as a threat for many. So the first years were rough for a small startup that was trying to have some space in the big leagues, and true to their purpose, they kept going. In 2012, they officially began operating. At their debut in the financial world, they presented themselves as an alternative to traditional financial services. In November 2012, the company was distinguished with the national innovation award Avonni, in the Service category.

In 2013 Cumplo got certified as a B Enterprise. They were seeking to be better for the world, incorporating social and environmental impact into their results. Cumplo was one of the first in Chile to obtain this certification, which they still hold until now.

Cumplo started its expansion: they landed in México in 2018. They were seeking to expand the network and renew their commitment to build a fairer financial market. In June of that year they financed their first USD100,000.

In 2022 they kept the growing spirit and opened Cumplo Perú, with the same purpose since 2011.

Organizational structure 

The founder of Cumplo is Nicholas Shea, Commercial Engineer from Pontificia Universidad Católica from Chile, MBA from Stanford University and MA in Education from Columbia University. The CEO of the company is Gonzalo Kirberg, Commercial Engineer from Pontificia Universidad Católica from Chile, MBA from Kellog School of Management.

The Country Manager from México is Alejandro Villalobos, System Engineer from Monterrey Institute of Technology and Higher Education, MBA from Collective Academy. In Perú, the Country Manager is Daniel Lira, Economist from Universidad del Pacífico. And in Chile is Oliver Vega, Comercial Engineer from Universidad de las Américas, MBA from Pontificia Universidad Católica from Chile.

Financial services companies of Chile
B Lab-certified corporations